Rachael May Taylor (born 11 July 1984) is an Australian actress and model. Her first lead role was in the Australian series headLand (2005–2006). She then made the transition to Hollywood, appearing in films including Man-Thing (2005), See No Evil (2006), Transformers (2007), Bottle Shock (2008), Cedar Boys (2009), Splinterheads (2009), Shutter (2008), Red Dog (2011), The Darkest Hour (2011) and Any Questions for Ben? (2012).

She has also starred as Dr. Lucy Fields on Grey's Anatomy, as one of the Angels on the short-lived reboot Charlie's Angels (both 2011), as the main character on the ABC show 666 Park Avenue (2012–2013), and in the NBC action/thriller series Crisis (2014).

She starred in the Netflix exclusive Marvel Cinematic Universe streaming superhero television shows Jessica Jones (2015–2019), Luke Cage (2016), and The Defenders (2017) as Trish Walker.

Early life
Taylor was born in Launceston, Tasmania, the daughter of Christine and Nigel Taylor. She attended Riverside High School and Trevallyn Primary School. Taylor had wanted to be an actress since she was a child, performing in many school plays. She graduated from Riverside High School in 2000.

Career
Taylor modelled for Skye-Jilly International and competed successfully in the state finals of Miss Teen Tasmania. She has appeared in a number of American productions – such as television movies about Natalie Wood and the making of Dynasty (where she played Catherine Oxenberg), and the horror movies Man-thing and See No Evil.

Taylor played Sasha Forbes on the short-lived Australian drama series headLand. On 3 April 2006, she was nominated for a Logie Award for Most Popular New Female Talent for her role on headLand.

Her most prominent role to date was as Maggie, a signals analyst, in the 2007 Transformers, where she appeared alongside Megan Fox and Shia LaBeouf. Taylor confirmed that she would not be returning for the Transformers sequel. In 2008, Taylor scored a starring role in the US horror-thriller Shutter, a remake of the 2004 Thai film of the same name opposite Joshua Jackson. Despite mixed reviews, the film was a box-office success.

In 2009, she completed the Australian feature Cedar Boys and starred in the comedy Splinterheads. In 2010, she starred alongside Alex Dimitriades in the Australian romantic drama Summer Coda.  She has also signed to the HBO comedy series Washingtonienne and Melt, an Australian production. Taylor began a recurring role on Grey's Anatomy as Dr. Lucy Fields, an obstetrician and maternal-fetal fellow.<ref>{{cite web |url=https://www.bloody-disgusting.com/news/20215 |title=Transformers Hottie Joins Alien Invasion at The Darkest Hour |website=Bloody Disgusting |author=Miska, Brad  |date=May 14, 2010}}</ref>

In 2011, Taylor joined the cast of the short-lived remake of the television series Charlie's Angels. Also in 2011, she had a major role in the film Red Dog and starred in the Russian science-fiction thriller film The Darkest Hour, directed by filmmaker Chris Gorak.

Taylor had a key supporting role in the 2012 Australian comedy Any Questions for Ben?, created by Working Dog Productions. Although the film performed disappointingly at the box-office and received lukewarm reviews, Taylor was praised for her role. Leigh Paatsch in the Herald-Sun wrote "Taylor exudes a warmth and assurance (in her performance). It is a shame she is missing in action for lengthy spells in the picture."

From 2012 to 2013, Taylor starred in the new drama 666 Park Avenue. She was next cast in the 2014 NBC series Crisis, which ran for one season. In 2015, Taylor starred in Jessica Jones as the titular character's best friend Trish Walker. She would go on to reprise the role in a voiceover cameo in Luke Cage in 2016, in The Defenders in 2017, a second season of Jessica Jones in 2018, and the series's final season in 2019.

In 2014, Taylor played a supporting role in the thriller The Loft, a remake of the 2008 original, alongside fellow Australian Isabel Lucas. In 2016, Taylor portrayed the character Rachel Hill in Gold. In 2018, Taylor appeared in Ladies in Black, an Australian comedy-drama.

In 2019, Taylor appeared in Finding Steve McQueen'' as Molly Murphy, where she starred alongside Travis Fimmel, Forest Whitaker, and William Fichtner.

Filmography

Film

Television

References

External links

1984 births
21st-century Australian actresses
Actresses from Tasmania
Australian female models
Australian film actresses
Australian television actresses
Australian people of English descent
Australian expatriate actresses in the United States
Living people
People from Launceston, Tasmania